S Vulpeculae is a variable star located in the constellation Vulpecula. A supergiant star, it is around 382 times the diameter of the Sun.

S Vulpeculae was first suspected of varying in brightness in 1836 and this was confirmed by 1862. A pulsating variable that grows and shrinks as it changes in brightness, it has been variously classified as an RV Tauri variable, a semiregular variable star, or a Cepheid variable.

S Vulpeculae is now confirmed as a classical Cepheid variable with one of the longest known periods at 68 days, although the period has changed several times.  As such, it is also one of the cooler and more luminous of the Cepheids, and it lies close to the zone where semiregular variable stars are found.  The shape and amplitude of the light curve varies significantly from cycle to cycle and secularly.  The apparent magnitude ranges from 8.69 to 9.42.  The spectrum varies from early G to late K as it pulsates, with TiO bands typical of an M1 star when the star is coolest.

References

Vulpecula
Classical Cepheid variables
Vulpeculae, S
K-type supergiants
338867
Durchmusterung objects
G-type supergiants